"Wynona's Big Brown Beaver" is a song by the American rock band Primus. It was released as the first single from their 1995 album Tales from the Punchbowl. It was nominated for the Grammy Award for Best Hard Rock Performance in 1996. Of the band's three members, only guitarist Larry LaLonde showed up at the event. The award went to Pearl Jam for their song "Spin the Black Circle".

Track listing
 "Wynona's Big Brown Beaver" – 4:23
 "Hello Skinny/Constantinople" – 4:44 (originally by The Residents)
 "Hellbound 17½ (Theme From)" – 2:59 
 "Have a Cigar" – 5:26 (only available on German edition of the single; originally by Pink Floyd)

Music video
The band also filmed a music video for "Wynona's Big Brown Beaver", centered on the band dressed as cartoonish plastic cowboys in costumes made of foam rubber. The costumes bore a strong resemblance to those used in a popular Duracell advertising campaign at the time which featured a family of battery-powered, toy-like people (the Puttermans). In an interview, bandleader Les Claypool revealed the suits were intended to resemble "cheap plastic cowboy action figures". The video jumps between shots of the band playing in a barn and of the band engaged in parodies of cowboy activities such as shooting bottles, riding toy horses, and playing poker among other things. The video also features some airbrushed drawings done by Claypool. The video's live action sequences were filmed at Claypool's home, known as Rancho Relaxo. The video marks the second video appearance of Les' red Fender Jazz bass.

Because the band's cowboy suits were so cumbersome, they played along to the track slowed down significantly to more easily coordinate their actions to the music; plus, this gave the illusion of the band moving rather quirky and fast when played back in regular form. In the video, Tim Alexander's bass drum reads Buck Naked and the Bare Bottom Boys, a tribute to Phillip Bury, lead singer of that band. Bury, a close friend of Primus, was killed in 1992. The video appeared on Primus' Tales from the Punchbowl [CD-ROM] album as well as the 2003 EP/DVD release Animals Should Not Try to Act Like People, along with an in-depth making-of feature.

Controversy
Many incorrectly believed "Wynona" was about actress Winona Ryder. Claypool has stated several times that the song was not written about anyone in particular, especially Ryder, and was surprised he wasn't asked about country singer Wynonna Judd instead, considering the song's country music influence and the name being pronounced and spelled with a "y", which was closer to Judd's name.

One of the song's lyrics was edited in the music video. The original line, "But the beaver was quick and grabbed him by the kiwis, and he ain't pissed for a week (and a half!)" was replaced by "But the beaver was quick and grabbed him by the kiwis, and he egg-pressed for a week (and a half!)". An alternative version also removes the line "candied up his nose" (which refers to cocaine) and the word "smell", replacing them with random sound effects.

Appearances
The song appears at the beginning of Kevin Smith's film Zack and Miri Make a Porno. 

Voodoo Brewery makes "Wynona's Big Brown Ale" in honor of the song and band.

Charts

References

Primus (band) songs
Music controversies
1995 singles
1995 songs
Songs written by Les Claypool
Songs written by Larry LaLonde
Interscope Records singles
Songs written by Tim Alexander